California Hill is a hill in Nebraska, and the first major hill ascended by emigrants on the Oregon Trail.
East of O'Fallon's Bluffs, the trail begins to turn southward along the South Platte River. The migrants had to make a decision of where to cross the river and then over the divide between the north and south branches. The North Platte River was the preferred route towards Fort Laramie and Casper, Wyoming. A variety of crossings were used, but the most often chosen was named the California Crossing. While shallow, the South Plattes sandy bottom created a major obstacle for heavy wagons. Quicksand and moving water were the cause of wrecks, drownings, and deaths from exposure. This was accentuated as the main crossing season was in May and early June and the rivers became swollen from the spring melt in the mountains.
Once over, the emigrants faced California Hill. While not as steep as the hills ahead of them on the trail, this was the first major hill that they faced.

Current status
The South Platte River has changed since the era of the wagon trains due to the growth of brush, and other vegetation, and changed created by the division of water for irrigation of the fields along the valley. The ruts leading up from U.S. 30 are gentle swales covered by plants. To the northwest, the ruts appear as cuts in the hillside.

References

Oregon Trail
California Trail